The 2002–03 Harvard Crimson women’s ice hockey team played in the NCAA championship game, Harvard was first in the National Polls for 14 consecutive weeks. In addition, the Crimson had a 28-game unbeaten streak and captured the ECAC regular-season and Ivy League titles. The Crimson won the Beanpot for the fifth straight season. Jennifer Botterill set an NCAA record (since tied) for most points in one game with 10. This was accomplished on January 28, 2003 versus Boston College.

Regular season
On January 18, 2003, Harvard beat Boston College by a 17-2 mark, the largest margin of victory in NCAA history.

Beanpot
February 4, 2003
Harvard 7, Boston University 0
February 11, 2003
Harvard 7, Boston College 0
Jennifer Botterill claimed her third Beanpot Most Valuable Player award.

Player stats

Skaters

Goaltenders

Postseason
The Crimson won the Frozen Four semifinal by defeating the Minnesota Golden Gophers by a 6-1 score. In the final, the Crimson took the Minnesota Duluth Bulldogs to double overtime. The Crimson would lose the game by a 4-3 score.

Harvard 6, Minnesota 1
Minnesota-Duluth 4, Harvard 3 (OT)

Awards and honors
Jennifer Botterill, AHCA First Team All-American
Jennifer Botterill, Beanpot Most Valuable Player
Jennifer Botterill, Patty Kazmaier Award Winner
 Jennifer Botterill, NCAA leader, 2002-03 season, Assists per game, 2.03
Julie Chu, AHCA Second Team All-American
Julie Chu, NCAA Frozen Four All-Tournament Team

 Jessica Ruddock, NCAA leader, 2002-03 season, Goalie winning percentage, .883
Angela Ruggiero, AHCA First Team All-American
Angela Ruggiero, NCAA Frozen Four All-Tournament Team

References

External links
Official Site

Harvard Crimson women's ice hockey seasons
Harvard
NCAA women's ice hockey Frozen Four seasons
Har
Harvard Crimson women's ice hockey
Harvard Crimson women's ice hockey
Harvard Crimson women's ice hockey
Harvard Crimson women's ice hockey